Corpus Delicti was a French gothic rock band active in the early-mid 1990s. In the late 1990s, the band briefly reformed as an industrial rock band called Corpus.

Two ex-Corpus Delicti members, Franck Amendola and Christophe Baudrion, later formed the rock band "Press Gang Metropol". They were joined by Eric Chabaud on drums and Sébastien Pietrapiana, also an ex-Corpus Delicti member, on vocals, and released their first album in early 2012.

Members
Sébastien Pietrapiana alias "Sebastian" - Vocals and synths
Laurence Romanini alias "Roma" - Drums and percussion
Jérôme Schmitt alias "Jerome" - Guitars, synths and programming
Christophe Baudrion alias "Chrys" - Bass
Laetitia - Violins
Franck Amendola alias "Franck" - Guitars (on Twilight)
"David" - keyboards, sampling and programming (on Syn:Drom)

Discography

Corpus Delicti

Albums
 Twilight – (1993, Hit Import and Glasnost Records)
 Sylphes – (1994, Hit Import and Glasnost Records)
 Obsessions – (1995, Cemetery Records. Remastered and rereleased in 1997 with extra tracks, Nightbreed recordings)

Maxis
 Noxious (The Demon's Game) – (1994, Hit Import and Glasnost Records)

Compilations
 Sarabands – (1996, Cleopatra Records)
 The Best of Corpus Delicti – (1998, Cleopatra Records)
 The History of Corpus Delicti – (1998, Radio Luxor)
 From Dawn to Twilight – (2006, D-monic)
 A New Saraband Of Sylphes - (2007, D-monic)
 Highlights 2010 ( D Monic )
 Last Obsessions  2011 ( D-Monic )

Corpus
 Syn:Drom – (1998, Season of Mist)

References

External links
FranKa - FATS Studio 
Press Gang Metropol
Official site
D Monic.net
Jerome's mastering studio

French gothic rock groups
French alternative rock groups
Organizations based in Nice
Musical groups from Provence-Alpes-Côte d'Azur